The Armory Volume 1 is a 1983 role-playing game supplement designed by Kevin Dockery and published by Firebird Limited.

Contents
The Armory Volume 1 is a compendium of game statistics for gunpowder weapons from the 14th-century to modern day weapons for Espionage! and Mercenaries, Spies and Private Eyes.

Reception
William A. Barton reviewed The Armory Volume 1 in Space Gamer No. 72. Barton commented that "The Armory Vol. 1 (second edition) is the best weapons reference book of its type I've seen yet. I recommend it to all gamers who care about the difference between various weapons and how they function in play."

Reviews
Adventurers Club #5 (Fall, 1984 Digest)

References

Role-playing game books
Role-playing game supplements introduced in 1983